The Grand Duet in E-flat minor by John Thomas is written for two harps. Described as one of John Thomas's best compositions, it consists of three movements:

I. Allegro con brio
II. Adagio
III. Allegro con spirito

References

External links 

Compositions for harp
Instrumental duets
Compositions in E-flat minor